Kevin Summers (born  is an Australian actor and playwright who has worked in theatre, film & television for over four decades.

Career

Television

Summers' is best known for his multiple character roles in numerous soap operas and serials. His credits include:
Cop Shop Ralph Fuley (1978)
Worst Day of my Life
The Sullivans
Holiday Island (1981)
Phoenix
Stingers
Blue Heelers in 5 different roles
Neighbours Alex Carter (1986)/Cliff Browning (1998)/Det Sgt. Goldstein (2001)/Detective Alec Skinner (2003–2010)
Prisoner Det Sgt. Parsons (1979-1980/Lou Reynolds (1982)/Reverent Alpha Certauri (1983)/(1984/85, appeared in 21 episodes) as Ben Fulbright,

Theatre

Summers' theatre work includes the role of Lionel Murphy in Conspiracy, a return season of Ron Blair's one man piece The Christian Brothers, and St Thomas in The Trial of Judas Iscariot. He performed Neil LaBute's solo work, "Wrecks" in 2014.

Playwright

Summers' own plays include:
The Empty Say La Mama)
Blamey (Chapel off Chapel)
Amendment to Terror (La Mama)
Salvation Jane (Chapel off Chapel)
Patient 12 (La Mama), published by Currency Press.

Some of his more recent work is in the (Melbourne, Australia) corporate sector with Laughing Matters. His agent is Melissa Rose Management.

Personal life

Summers has been married to Jo for over 21 years and they have a dog named Sammy. He is also an uncle, a godfather and a grand uncle. He loves sport and plays golf. Summers is also a fan of the Western Bulldogs and horse racing. Australian and international politics is another of his passions.

References

Australian male actors
1950 births
Living people